Alexander Medvedev (born 23 May 1979) is a Russian professional ice hockey player who is currently playing for Shakhtar Soligorsk in the Belarusian Extraleague.

References 

1979 births
Living people
Russian ice hockey defencemen
HC Shakhtyor Soligorsk players
Sportspeople from Yaroslavl